Inongo Airport  is an airstrip serving Inongo, a city on the eastern shore of Lake Mai-Ndombe in Mai-Ndombe Province, Democratic Republic of Congo.

See also

Transport in the Democratic Republic of the Congo
List of airports in the Democratic Republic of the Congo

References

External links
 FallingRain - Inongo Airport
 
 OpenStreetMap - Inongo Airport
 OurAirports - Inongo Airport
 

Airports in Mai-Ndombe Province